The Endless Bummer EP is an EP by the San Diego, California pop rock band Reeve Oliver, released in March 2007 by Apple Danish Records. The band hand-screened covers and CD artwork for the first 100 copies of the EP, which were numbered and labeled as "Limited Edition." These copies were sold at a performance at SOMA on March 16, 2007, and some copies were also sold at local record stores. These "Limited Edition" copies were distributed in advance of the EP's public release date.

Track listing
"Tour Song #2"
"Endless Bummer"
"Stove" (originally performed by The Lemonheads)
"Hell Week"
"I Can See the World From Here"
"#3"

Performers
Sean O'Donnell - vocals, guitar
O (Otis R.) - bass
Brad Davis - drums

Album information
Record label: Apple Danish Records
Produced, recorded, and mixed by Sean O'Donnell at Jumbosound Studios, Winter 2007 except "Endless Bummer" produced and recorded by Neal Avron and mixed by Tom Lord-Alge.
Mastered by EZ-E-Literate at Basket of Puppies Mastering

Reeve Oliver albums
2007 EPs